was a Japanese pop idol group in the early 1990s. Sakurakko Club was also the name of the television show on which they appeared alongside such groups as SMAP and Tokio.

Members

Releases
 [1992.11.25] Nani ga Nandemo (なにがなんでも)
 [1993.07.01] DO-Shite (DO－して)
 [1993.08.01] La Soldier (ラ・ソウルジャー)
 [1994.08.24] Mou Ichido Waratte yo (もう一度笑ってよ)
 [1995.07.21] "Rashiku" Ikimasho / Moonlight Densetsu (”らしく”いきましょ / ムーンライト伝説) (with Meu) under name "Moon Lips"

Spin-off
 Key West Club
Miki Nakatani
Keiko Azuma

 Momo
Anza Ohyama
Ayako Morino

 Moonlips
Anza Ohyama
Ayako Morino
Misako Kotani
Noriko Kamiyama
Nana Suzuki

See also
 Sailor Moon
 Naoko Takeuchi
 Sailor Moon musicals
 Anza Ohyama

Japanese dance groups
Japanese dance music groups
Japanese Eurodance groups
Japanese girl groups
Japanese idol groups
Japanese pop music groups
Musical groups established in 1991
Musical groups disestablished in 1995